Charles Baldwen (born 1593) was an English politician who sat in the House of Commons from 1640 to 1644. He  supported the Royalist  cause in the English Civil War.

Baldwin was the son of William Baldwin of Elsich, in parish of Diddlebury. In April 1640, Baldwin was elected Member of Parliament for Ludlow in the Short Parliament. He was re-elected MP for Ludlow for the Long Parliament in November 1640. He was disabled from sitting in parliament on 5 February 1644 for deserting the service of the house, being in the kings quarters, and adhering to that party.
 
Baldwin married, in 1617, a daughter of Francis Holland of Burwarton, Shropshire. He had two sons, Samuel and Timothy, who were both eminent lawyers and received knighthoods.

References

1593 births
Year of death missing
English MPs 1640 (April)
Cavaliers
English MPs 1640–1648